L S Kandasamy (1939–1992) was a Tamil teacher and writer. He was born in Lakkapuram near Rasipuram and did his masters in Tamil at Madras University.

Dr. L S Kandasamy began his career as a school teacher and in 1972 joined Tamil Nadu Agricultural University. While serving as the head of the department, he also served as editor for Valarum Vellanmai a journal targeted to educate the farmer community. This journal focused on communicating technology and science development in agriculture. Dr. L S Kandasamy who is an agriculturalist himself and literati was instrumental in interpreting information in science to a practical solution for the farmer community. He wrote many novels, modern poetry, self-improvement and agriculture. In 1989 he started Thannambikkai, a monthly magazine with an emphasis on self-improvement. Thannambikkai is now published by his family and friends.

External links 
 "A magazine for personality development", by Subha J. Rao on 18 April 2004, The Hindu
 Thannambikkai Magazine website
 Google Books list of works authored or co-authored
 The Agrarian History of South Asia

1939 births
1992 deaths
Tamil-language writers
University of Madras alumni